Precortistatin is a protein that in humans is encoded by the CORT gene. The 105 amino acid residue human precortistatin in turn is cleaved into cortistatin-17 and cortistatin-29. Cortistatin-17 is the only active peptide derived from the precursor. Cortistatin (or more specifically cortistatin-17) is a neuropeptide that is expressed in inhibitory neurons of the cerebral cortex, and which has a strong structural similarity to somatostatin. Unlike somatostatin, when infused into the brain, it enhances slow-wave sleep. It binds to sites in the cortex, hippocampus and the amygdala.

Function 

Cortistatin is a neuropeptide with strong structural similarity to somatostatin (both peptides belong to the same family). It binds to all known somatostatin receptors, and shares many pharmacological and functional properties with somatostatin, including the depression of neuronal activity. However, it also has many properties distinct from somatostatin, such as induction of slow-wave sleep, apparently by antagonism of the excitatory effects of acetylcholine on the cortex, reduction of locomotor activity, and activation of cation selective currents not responsive to somatostatin.

References

Further reading

Neuropeptides